Death spiral may refer to:

 Aircraft flight:
 Graveyard spiral
 Spiral dive
 Death spiral (figure skating), an element of pair skating
 Death spiral (insurance), an insurance plan whose costs are rapidly increasing
 Death spiral financing
 Ant mill, a behavioral phenomenon in ants
 Death Spiral, a 1989 novel by John Ballem
 "Death Spiral", a song by Dirty Projectors from Dirty Projectors